Bunyan Edmund Vijayam (1933–2019) was an Indian geologist with major contribution to the field of Geology.  A 1958–1959 Technical Report of the Council of Scientific and Industrial Research heralded the news that new developments had taken place in scientific matters led by a team of researchers at the Andhra University,

Even as a student of geology at Andhra University, Waltair, Vijayam and his fellow researchers were already carrying out research in the field.  During 1954–1958, Vijayam had carried out research on geology in parts of Kurnool district.  Vijayam's research articles began appearing in geological and other inter-disciplinary scientific journals for more than three decades and continue to be referred by the present generation of Geologists.

Vijayam stood witness to Christ and inspired many.  During the Fifth National Convention of the Christian Businessmen's Committee in 1987 held in Hyderabad, he spoke on the theme You shall be witnesses unto me and shared dais with Archbishop Samineni Arulappa, Member of parliament, Lok Sabha Marjorie Godfrey and Policeman G. Alfred, IPS.  Vijayam also led honorary initiatives towards Christian missions by equipping the Laity not only with knowledge of the Gospel, but also a means of livelihood was recognised by Theologians, comprising the Missiologist, Roger Hedlund, SB, and Bishop Ezra Sargunam, ECI.  During the 2000s, the Christian artist P. Solomon Raj, AELC made an Empirical research highlighting the new and indigenous missions, and Vijayam's effort falls in such line of indigenous missions to equip the grassroot Evangelists, which even the Old Testament Scholar, Victor Premasagar, CSI appreciated such initiatives.

Life and background
Vijayam was born in 1933 in Giddaluru in erstwhile Madras Presidency during the colonial era to Bunyan Joseph, an Evangelist and grew up in rural India in the drought-prone Rayalaseema zone in southern India.  The Church made an impact in the life of Vijayam as those were the days' of early Christians in the Telugu hinterland where the Catholic and the Protestant Missions had already set foot.  Among the Protestant missions, the American Baptist Foreign Missionary Society, the London Missionary Society (LMS) and the Society for the Propagation of the Gospel (SPG) were the Christian missions at work in the Rayalaseema area.  Vijayam grew up in a Christian household in mission compounds of the Churches as his father was a Priest, Canon and later Bishop.  When Vijayam moved to Waltair in the 1950s, he also took part in the fellowship gatherings of the Canadian Baptist Ministries (Convention of Baptist Churches of Northern Circars).

Education and career

Education
After initial studies in schools across Andhra Pradesh, wherever his father (Bunyan Joseph) was transferred, Vijayam moved to Madras Christian College, Tambaram for a pre-University course (PUC).  For undergraduate studies, he enrolled at Andhra University, Waltair, in 1953 and pursued graduate and postgraduate courses specialising in Geology.  He was a direct student of Professor Calamur Mahadevan and U. Aswathanarayana and imbibed the subtle nuances for research which infused in him a flair for scientific research throughout his career in geological sciences.  One of his companions during his study days at Waltair included the Theologian G. D. Melanchthon, AELC.  Vijayam was awarded with an M. Sc. in 1957.

Vijayam also pursued a Ph. D. programme during his early years at Osmania University, Secunderabad, on the topic Sedimentation in the upper proterozoic near Kurnool under the supervision of Prof. S. Balakrishna and was awarded a doctorate in the year 1965.  He also spent time at Northwestern University, Evanston (United States) as a Postdoctoral researcher through the benevolence of Fulbright Program and also published a research article, Tectonic framework of sedimentation in the northwestern part of the San Andreqa fault zone at Park field, California on his return to India.

Career
Vijayam joined the ranks of Geological Survey of India in 1961.  He then moved to academics and joined Osmania University, Secunderabad, A State-run university, where he also pursued a Ph. D. programme.  In 1965 and became a lecturer in the same university.  Over the years, he rose to the ranks of a reader and professor and in 1984, he became head of the Department of Geology and chairperson of the board of studies.

Articles published
During the three decades, beginning with the 1960s, Vijayam researched together with his fellow geologists and brought out different aspects of the Earth's rich resources to the fore.  He was also managing editor of Journal of Indian Academy of Geoscience during the 1970s.

1960–1969

1970–1979

1980–1989

1990–1999

Other initiatives
In addition to his academic pursuits, Vijayam was involved in founding entities as a means to bring in development in rural areas.  Vijayam himself hailed from a rural family and his career pursuits brought him to an urban setting.  In spite of it, he chose to better the lives of those in special circumstances.  Towards this end, he drew talent from universities as a matter of service and also sought the partnership of United Nations Development Programme, Government of India, and other funding agencies.  In 1982, he also went to Bangla Desh to see the work of Social Entrepreneur and Nobel laureate Muhammad Yunus.  In 2012, two sets of researchers working independent of each other had written about the work of Vijayam beyond the portals of learning.

A University of Hyderabad researcher, Gadde Peda Rattaiah referred to the work of Vijayam in the context of partnerships with United Nations Development Programme and writes,

Similarly, a group of Earth Scientists regarded the work of Vijayam in connecting Geology with development and write,

MERIBA
During 1978 Vijayam founded Mission to Encourage Rural Development in Backward Areas (MERIBA) as an entity to bring forth development in select areas of drought-prone Rayalaseema area of Andhra Pradesh amidst caste-ridden hegemony.  The work of MERIBA was taken up in Kurnool district in the villages of Balapanuru, Kouluru, Neravada, Bhimaram and Yerraguntla.  For organising Dalits through participatory management initiatives through Sarvodaya Sanghams, Vijayam's entity was also locked in horns with those oppressing the Dalits.  There was indeed some resistance to the reformation that MERIBA ought to bring in and even the State executive was found to be in tandem with those oppressing the Dalits.  It took judicial intervention to get the oppressors behind bars, but in no time they were freed and were ready to seek vengeance, but for the timely presence of Vijayam who sought reconciliation, an act which stunned the oppressors.  Incidentally, Nagi Reddy, an advocate by profession, became MERIBA's first project director, and there was renewed activism in taking legal recourse in curbing atroticities on Dalits through SC/ST (Prevention of Atrocities) Act.

PROGRESS
By 1982, Vijayam founded Peoples Research Organization for Grass-root Environmental Scientific Services (PROGRESS) as a platform to share the benefits of technological advancement with the rural poor.  Select case studies and stories relating to the success of PROGRESS had been documented in 1994 by National Afforestation and Eco-Development Board and there also had been significant contribution by scientists working in PROGRESS to the environmental studies.  In 1996, P. Sita Janki and K. Sumalini contributed a paper entitled Enhancement of seed germination in Amla (Emblica officinalis Gaertn.) by different growth regulator treatments that appeared in the Journal for Tropical Forestry.  A 2007 report of the University Grants Commission (UGC) listed PROGRESS among those NGOs  supported by it in advancing Rural development.  PROGRESS was a member in the National Institute of Hydrology, Roorkee.

TENT
The Theologians, F. Hrangkhuma and Sebastian Kim had recognised the efforts of Vijayam towards Tentmaking.  At the same time, Roger Hedlund had acknowledged Vijayam's efforts towards founding TENT in equipping individuals with means of livelihood as well as basic theological principles.  It was in 1985 that Vijayam founded Training in Evangelism Needs and Technology (TENT), intertwining technology with theology for ministerial advancement, which the notable Entomologist P. Judson has also been associated.

See also

 Prof. Dr. C. Mahadevan, Ph. D. (Madras),
 Prof. Dr. M. Abel, Ph. D. (California),
 Prof. Dr. U. Aswathanarayana, D. Sc. (Andhra),
 Prof. T. D. J. Nagabhushanam, Ph. D. (IARI),
 Prof. P. A. James, Ph. D. (Osmania),
 Dr. J. A. Oliver, Ph. D. (ANGRAU),
 Prof. P. Judson, Ph. D. (Osmania)

Further reading

References

2019 deaths
Telugu people
Indian Christians
20th-century Indian scientists
Indian geologists
Andhra Pradesh academics
1933 births
Scientists from Hyderabad, India
Indian scientists
Church of South India
Osmania University alumni
Andhra University alumni
Madras Christian College alumni
Northwestern University alumni
Scientists from Andhra Pradesh